Little Women, also known as  or , is a 1981 Japanese animated television series adaptation of Louisa May Alcott's 1868-69 two-volume novel Little Women. The series is directed by Kazuya Miyazaki (a veteran Toei director whose credits included Cutie Honey and UFO Robo Grendizer among others) and produced by Toei Animation for the Kokusai Eiga-sha (Movie International) company.

The series was produced as a follow-up to a TV special based on Alcott's novel the previous year by the same animation studio. The TV series character designs differ slightly from those of the TV special; Jo, for example, while she is blonde in both versions, has curled hair rather than straight hair in the TV series.

This series is sometimes confused with Nippon Animation's 1987 World Masterpiece Theater TV series Tales of Little Women, as both series were dubbed in English and broadcast on U.S. cable TV in the 1980s (the 1981 series on CBN, and the 1987 series on HBO). In addition, both TV series share a voice actress: Keiko Han, who plays Beth in this TV series, and Meg in the 1987 series.

Characters

Production

Staff
 Series director: Kazuya Miyazaki
 Script: Eiichi Imado
 Character designs: Joji Kikuchi
 Animation directors: Joji Kikuchi, Takeshi Shirado
 Backgrounds: Tadami Shimokawa

Music
Openings

April 7, 1981 - September 29, 1981
Lyricist: Jun Takita / Composer: Takeo Watanabe / Arranger: Yushi Matsuyama / Singers: Mitsue Kondo
Episodes: 1-26

Endings

April 7, 1981 - September 29, 1981
Lyricist: Juzo Tsubota, Jun Takita / Composer: Takeo Watanabe / Arranger: Yushi Matsuyama / Singers: Mitsue Kondo
Episodes: 1-26

Broadcast
This TV series aired on Tokyo Channel 12 from April 7 to September 29, 1981, totaling 26 episodes. It aired from 18:00 to 18:30 on Tuesdays. While this series has been released on VHS, it has not been released on DVD in Japan due to the original film negatives being damaged.

See also
 Little Women (1987 TV series), Nippon Animation's adaptation of Louisa May Alcott's novel.

External links
 
 Enoki Films' Wakakusa no Yon Shimai (Little Women) page

1981 anime television series debuts
1981 Japanese television series endings
Historical anime and manga
Romance anime and manga
School life in anime and manga
Toei Animation television
Television series based on Little Women